Peter Randolph Johl (August 16, 1927 – November 3, 2005) was an American actor and singer who enjoyed a long career on Broadway, in touring companies, and off-Broadway. His wide voice range enabled him to sing a broad variety of roles in opera, sacred music, as well as musicals. As an actor, he was equally comfortable performing in Shakespearian or modern roles.

Early life
Johl was born in Scarsdale, New York on August 16, 1927. His father, Max Gustav Johl, owned a small factory and a very large piece of land at Trails Corner, on the outskirts of Groton, Connecticut, where the family had relocated when Peter was very young. His mother, Janet ( Janet Lambert Pagter), was a housewife and collector of dolls. The couple had three children: Peter, John (b. 1930) and little Janet (b. 1940). Although Max Johl was of Jewish descent, the connection had become tenuous and the Johl family observed Christian rituals, while Janet Johl was a practising Christian Scientist. In the winter of 1940, Peter Johl played the lead role of Scrooge in his school's production of A Christmas Carol. In 1952, he was a pupil of Grace Leslie's studio in New York and performed at a concert given by her students in Amesbury, Massachusetts, during which he sang three pieces as a tenor: Henry Purcell's "The Cares of Lovers", Robert Jones' "Farewell Dear Love" and Leonard Gybson's "Light O' Love".

Career
In 1961, he was a junior at East Carolina College, by which time he had accumulated extensive experience in summer stock and toured with the Grass Roots Opera Company of North Carolina. He was tenor soloist for the presentation of The Messiah on many occasions in New Jersey, New York and North Carolina.

As a stage actor, Johl defined himself as a character actor, and his most famous role was in Jekyll & Hyde (1997–2001) as Poole, Jekyll's manservant, and he played two other minor roles in the production. He appeared in many plays and musicals, including:
Baker Street: A Musical Adventure of Sherlock Holmes (1965), 
Pousse-Café (1966),
and She Loves Me (1993–1994). 

He was elected to The Lambs in 1991.

Death
Johl died in New York City on November 3, 2005. His tombstone indicates that he served in the US Marines during World War II and the Korean War.

Selected works

Stage
 A Christmas Carol (1940), as Scrooge
 The Hired Hand (1959), as the farmer
 Carmen (1960)
 Kismet (1960), as the bandit Jawan
 The seven words of Jesus Christ on the Cross (1961), as guest soloist
 My Fair Lady (1964), as Alfred P. Doolittle
 Baker Street: A Musical Adventure of Sherlock Holmes (1965), as a singer
 Pousse-Café (1966), as Professor George Ritter (standby)
 Fiddler on the Roof (1969), as Tevye (replacement)
 Rainbow Jones (1974), as Uncle Ithaca
 The Daydreams of a Young Lady (1978)
 Sly Fox (1979), as Captain Jethro Crouch
 Men in White (1979), as Dr Hochberg
 City Sugar (1979), as newscaster
 Frankovich (1982)
 Henry IV, Part One (1982), as Ralph Neville, Earl of Westmorland
 The Price (1985), as Gregory Solomon
 The Sweetshoppe Myriam (1986)
 The Comedy of Errors (1988), as Egeon
 She Loves Me (1993–1994), as Mr. Maraczek (replacement)
 The Last Leaf (1994), as Behrman
 Jekyll & Hyde (1997–2001), as Doctor, Lord G, Poole (replacement)

Book narrator
 Ambush at Soda Creek (1977), by Lewis B. Patten

References

Citations

Sources

Books

Newspapers

Websites

External links
 

1927 births
2005 deaths
American male opera singers
American male musical theatre actors
American male actors
People from Groton, Connecticut
Members of The Lambs Club